Alom or ALOM may refer to:

 Alom (surname)
 Advanced Lights Out Manager, a Sun Microsystems's out-of-band management implementation
 Álom.net, a 2009 Hungarian romantic comedy film 
 Három álom, a 2011 album by Hungarian singer Zoli Ádok
 Alom, the Mayan sky god